Hunted is the fifth novel of the House of Night fantasy series written by P.C. Cast and Kristin Cast. The book was published on March 10, 2009, by St. Martin's Press, an extension of Macmillan Publishers. By February 2010, according to Publishers Weekly it had already sold 950.000 copies. Since, it was translated in more than 20 languages.

The book picks up after the events in Untamed. Kalona has sprung free of his prison and reigns over the minds and hearts of the fledglings at the Tulsa House of Night. Zoey and her friends hide deep under Tulsa, but they will soon learn that they can't hide forever and soon they'll have to get together to send him and Neferet away.

Plot
Zoey and her friends help Stevie Rae heal after the events at the end of Untamed – the arrow did not kill her, but took most of her lifeblood, so Kalona could be freed from the earth. Zoey and Stevie Rae reconcile, and the latter introduces Zoey's group to some of the red vampyre fledglings. Aphrodite lets Stevie Rae feed on her to heal, which forms an Imprint between them. When Erik follows Zoey on her way to her room they kiss, but then Erik gets too rough and scares her. Erik and Zoey get back together, though Zoey's not entirely sure due to Erik's possessiveness. Kalona starts getting into Zoey's dreams to seduce her, and calls her A-ya.

Kramisha, a red fledgling, is revealed to also express prophecies through her poetry, and Zoey gives her the title of Poet Laureate. This is how they find their first clue. One of Kramisha's poems states that Kalona and Neferet will be banished when Night, Humanity, Blood, Spirit and Earth come together, but Zoey doesn't know who will represent these elements.

Heath arrives at the tunnels, and Zoey goes outside to talk to him, much to Erik's anger. Heath tries to reconcile with her, but to no avail. A Raven Mocker attacks them and critically wounds Zoey. She drinks from Heath to heal and they Imprint again, but she is still weakened. Kramisha gets exited and loses her control a little when she sees Heath (a human), leading Zoey to realize that the red fledglings may still have problems with their self-control. Darius finally declares that Zoey needs exposure to more adult vampyres to survive, and she is forced to return to the House of Night, much to Neferet's pleasure. She finds out that Kalona's presence has caused the fledglings and the vampyres to turn their backs on Nyx. Kalona's favorite son, Rephaim, and Darius get into a fight. Kalona intercedes and gives Darius a huge scar which upsets Aphrodite.

Zoey successfully persuades Stark to turn back to the good side. He becomes the second red vampyre when he pledges his Warrior's Oath to Zoey and she accepts. Zoey discusses the situation with Lenobia and, upon analyzing Kramisha's poem again, finds out that she is Night, Blood is Stevie Rae, Humanity is Aphrodite, Sister Mary Angela is Spirit, and Grandma Redbird is Earth.

Zoey and her friends set fire to the school as a diversion and escape on horseback to the Benedictine Abbey. Zoey and the other people mentioned in the poem open a circle and send everyone else inside. Neferet, Kalona and Stark arrive quickly afterwards in an SUV, followed by the Raven Mockers. Neferet and Kalona take turns at threatening and cajoling Zoey but she finally accepts the truth: that although A-ya is a part of her, she will choose her own destiny. She rejects Kalona. Neferet orders Stark to shoot Zoey but he says that Zoey is his heart and aims at her while thinking of himself. Realizing what will happen, Zoey uses the elements to stop the arrow and knocks him out in the process. Night, Humanity, Blood, Spirit, and Earth complete the spell and banish Neferet and Kalona. Zoey's Mark spreads to across her scar. She is deeply in pain because she had to say goodbye to Kalona, and knows that the fight isn't over yet.

Characters

Zoey Redbird
Nyx
Erik Night
Stevie Rae
Neferet
Heath Luck
Aphrodite
Kalona
Sylvia Redbird – Zoey's grandmother
Darius – A son of Erebus
James Stark

Reception
In its opening week, the book ranked 1st in the New York Times, USA Today Top 150 Bestseller List, where it remained for 54 weeks.

"Forced by circumstance to grow up quickly, Zoey's emotional and spiritual evolution is fascinating. The Cast duo breathes life and vibrancy into the characters and makes each one an integral part of the saga. Awesome and unforgettable as always!"(Romantic Times)

"The most masterful part of the writing lies in how the authors take on serious issues sex, peer pressure, bullying, parental alienation, religion, and substance abuse and weave them into the text.  It is a refreshing perspective that doesn't feel like preaching."(Tulsa World)

References

External links
Hunted on the official website
Hunted on the publisher's website

2009 American novels
American young adult novels
American fantasy novels
American horror novels
Vampire novels
American romance novels
American vampire novels
House of Night series